Tammy and the Doctor is a 1963 Eastmancolor romantic comedy film directed by Harry Keller and starring Sandra Dee as Tambrey "Tammy" Tyree and Peter Fonda (in his film debut) as Dr. Mark Cheswick. It is the third of the four Tammy films.

Plot
Mrs. Call requires surgery in Los Angeles and is accompanied there by her young companion Tammy, a country girl from Mississippi, who later lands a job with the hospital staff. Tammy is attracted to handsome Dr. Mark Cheswick, whose superior, Dr. Bentley, and head nurse Rachel Coleman aren't sure that romance is a good idea.

Cast
Sandra Dee as Tambrey "Tammy" Tyree
Peter Fonda as Dr. Mark Cheswick
Macdonald Carey as Dr. Wayne Bentley
Beulah Bondi as Mrs. Call
Margaret Lindsay as Rachel Coleman
Reginald Owen as Jason Tripp
Alice Pearce as Millie
Adam West as Dr. Eric Hassler
Joan Marshall as Vera
Stanley Clements as Wally Day
Doodles Weaver as Traction patient
Mitzi Hoag as Pamela

Production
The film was announced in December 1961 as Tammy Takes Over'''. Dee made it after another film for Hunter, If a Man Answers.

Ross Hunter liked to develop new talent and the movie features 23 actors who had never made a film before. Among them was Peter Fonda, who had enjoyed critical acclaim for his performance in Blood, Sweat and Stanley Poole.  Hunter signed Peter Fonda to a seven years contract. Filmink'' magazine argued Fonda at this stage of his career was "a sort of poor man’s James Stewart – tall, gangly, boy next door, virginal looks, etc. (And Stewart was, famously, best friends with Fonda’s father, Henry)."

References

External links
 
 

1963 romantic comedy films
1963 films
1960s teen films
American romantic comedy films
Universal Pictures films
Tammy (film series)
Films set in Los Angeles
Films directed by Harry Keller
Films produced by Ross Hunter
Films scored by Frank Skinner
1960s English-language films
1960s American films